Gura Râului  is a commune in Sibiu County, Transylvania, Romania, at the foothills of the Cindrel Mountains,  west of the county capital Sibiu, in the Mărginimea Sibiului ethnographic area. It is composed of a single village, Gura Râului.

References

Communes in Sibiu County
Localities in Transylvania